The ND-500 was a 32-bit superminicomputer delivered in 1981 by Norsk Data. It relied on a ND-100 to do housekeeping tasks and run the OS, SINTRAN III. A configuration could feature up to four ND-500 CPUs in a shared-memory configuration.

Hardware implementations 

The ND-500 architecture lived through four distinct implementations. Each implementation was sold under a variety of different model numbers.

ND also sold multiprocessor configurations, naming them ND-580/n and an ND-590n, where n represented the number of CPUs in a given configuration, 2, 3, or 4.

ND-500/1
Sold as the ND-500, ND-520, ND-540, and ND-560.

ND-500/2
Sold as the ND-570, ND-570/CX, and ND-570/ACX.

ND-505
A 28-bit version of the ND-500 machine. Pins were snipped on the backplane, removing its status as a superminicomputer, allowing it to legally pass through the CoCom embargo.

Samson
Sold as the ND-5200, ND-5400, ND-5500, ND-5700, and ND-5800. The ND-120 CPU line, which constituted the ND-100 side of most ND-5000 computers, was named Delilah. As the 5000 line progressed in speed, the dual-arch ND-100/500 configuration increasingly became bottlenecked by all input/output (I/O) having to go through the ND-100.

Rallar
Sold as the ND-5830 and ND-5850. The Rallar processor consisted of two main VLSI gate arrays, KUSK (En: Jockey) and GAMP (En: Horse).

Software
LED was a programmer's source-code editor by Norsk Data running on the ND-500 computers running Sintran III. It featured automatic indenting, pretty-printing of source code, and integration with the compiler environment. It was sold as an advanced alternative to PED. Several copies exist, and it is installed on the NODAF public access ND-5700.

In 198283, Logica PLC in London undertook a project, on behalf of ND, to port Unix Berkley Software Distribution (BSD) 4.2 to the ND-500. A C compiler from Luleå University College in Northern Sweden was used. The goal was to port Unix BSD to the ND-500 and use the ND-100 running Sintran-III as the front end. Thus, all I/O had to go through the ND-100 which proved very inefficient. For example, running vi on the ND-500 brought the ND-100 to its knees. The purpose of the effort was so that ND could sell the 500 to the European Organization for Nuclear Research (CERN), who were buying VAXes from Digital Equipment Corporation. But the ND-500 was unable to meet CERN's goals. Although the ND-500 processor was very fast for its time, it couldn't compete with the superior VAX I/O architecture.

External links
 

Norsk Data minicomputers
32-bit computers